Segundo Alejandro Castillo Nazareno (born 15 May 1982) is an Ecuadorian retired professional footballer who last played for Guayaquil City of the Ecuadorian Serie A. Castillo mostly played as a defensive midfielder but can also play as a central midfielder. Between 2003 and 2016, he made 87 appearances for the Ecuador national team scoring 9 goals.

Club career
Born in San Lorenzo, Esmeraldas, Castillo started his career with Quito's Club Deportivo Espoli spending three years with the team, scoring a decent 11 goals in 66 appearances. He then moved across the capital to one of Ecuador's most successful sides Club Deportivo El Nacional, with whom he won successive league titles in 2005 and 2006. He again scored 11 goals in 112 matches for the club.

In August 2006 he moved abroad, signing a two-year deal with Serbian side Red Star Belgrade. He scored 8 goals during his first season at his new club and was a key player when the team won the double in 2007.  In total he scored 18 goals in 72 games, an average of a goal every four games.

In August 2008 Castillo joined English Premier League club Everton on a year-long loan deal to become Everton's second signing of the summer transfer window. He made his league debut on 14 September 2008 against Stoke City. He scored his only goal for the Toffees on his home debut against Standard Liège on 18 September 2008 in a UEFA Cup tie with a powerful volley from 25 yards out.

Castillo was not offered a permanent contract by Everton at the conclusion of his loan spell; it was reported that Red Star were asking for around £5 million to make the deal permanent.

Castillo returned to the Premier League once again when he joined newly promoted Wolverhampton Wanderers on a season-long loan on 31 August 2009. He made his Wolves debut against Fulham on 20 September 2009, and had a run of eight appearances before dropping out of the club's first team plans. Castillo received many offers from clubs including LDU Quito and Barcelona. On 29 July 2010, it was confirmed that Castillo would return to his home country, Ecuador and play for Deportivo Quito.

In June 2013 he signed a two-year contract to Saudi giants Al-Hilal. On 16 September 2014, Al-Hilal came to terms that Castillo would no longer fit into their plans.

On 4 December 2014, it was announced by Dorados de Sinaloa that Castillo would be joining their roster for the next season of the Ascenso MX.

On 28 December 2015, it was confirmed that Castillo would again returned to Ecuador to play for Barcelona Sporting Club.

International career
Castillo broke into the Ecuador national team in 2005, making his international debut on 17 August as a substitute against Venezuela. He became a regular player after this and was included in their squad for the 2006 FIFA World Cup. He played every minute of their World Cup campaign, where Ecuador reached the second round for the first time in their history. He has gained a starting role since the 2006 campaign, mainly as a defensive midfielder and has captained the team in a few occasions.

He scored his first qualifying goal from a second half stoppage time header on 12 October 2012, the third goal in a 3–1 home win against Chile. Castillo was essential to Ecuador's qualifying campaign, netting equalizers that would become crucial points towards qualifying to the 2014 FIFA World Cup, against Venezuela and Argentina.

Castillo was left out of the 2014 World Cup during a friendly match with Mexico due to a horrific collision with Luis Montes.

International goals
Score and result lists Ecuador's goals first

References

External links
 
 
 Segundo Castillo at Wolves site.

1982 births
Living people
People from San Lorenzo, Ecuador
Association football midfielders
Ecuadorian footballers
Ecuador international footballers
Ecuadorian expatriate sportspeople in England
2006 FIFA World Cup players
2007 Copa América players
2011 Copa América players
C.D. ESPOLI footballers
C.D. El Nacional footballers
Red Star Belgrade footballers
Everton F.C. players
Wolverhampton Wanderers F.C. players
S.D. Quito footballers
C.F. Pachuca players
Club Puebla players
Al Hilal SFC players
Dorados de Sinaloa footballers
Barcelona S.C. footballers
Guayaquil City F.C. footballers
Serbian SuperLiga players
Premier League players
Liga MX players
Ecuadorian expatriate footballers
Expatriate footballers in Serbia
Expatriate footballers in England
Expatriate footballers in Mexico
Expatriate footballers in Saudi Arabia
Saudi Professional League players